Convoy ON 67 was a trade convoy of merchant ships during the Second World War. It was the 67th of the numbered series of ON convoys Outbound from the British Isles to North America. The ships departed from Liverpool on 14 February 1942 with convoy rescue ship Toward, and were escorted to the Mid-Ocean Meeting Point by escort group B4.

The escort group

Edisons commanding officer, Commander Albert C. Murdaugh, USN, was the senior officer of the escort group. The escort group had never operated together before. Bernadou had been modified for long range escort work by replacing the fourth boiler and stack with an extra fuel tank. Nicholson had the only functional radar, though the merchant ship Toward could provide support with its High-frequency direction finding (HF/DF) set. Lea carried a British ASV aircraft radar with fixed antennae, but the coaxial cable to the antennae was repeatedly shorted by salt water spray. Edison had no depth charge throwers, and was limited to a linear pattern rolled off the stern. The American ships did not have enough binoculars. Bernadou had a 7x50 pair for the officer of the deck and a 6x30 pair for the junior officer of the deck but there were none for the lookouts. The escort was reinforced on 26 February by the  cutter .

U-155

 found and reported the convoy on 21 February. Toward obtained a bearing on the contact report, and Lea searched the bearing unsuccessfully at dusk. U-155 approached the port quarter of the convoy in the pre-dawn hours of 22 February and torpedoed the British tanker Adellen and Norwegian freighter . Both ships sank quickly. Algoma rescued eleven of Adellens crew of 31 while Nicholson and Toward found 20 survivors from Samas crew of 50. U-155 crash-dived to avoid Bernadou, but the destroyer never saw the U-boat. U-155 made another emergency dive while shadowing the convoy at 1042 hrs, but Edison did not detect the U-boat. ,  and  found the convoy on 23 February.

U-558
U-558 approached the convoy at 2120, but repeatedly turned away to avoid Bernadous patrols until a squall provided cover at midnight. U-558 torpedoed the Norwegian tanker Inverarder at 0045 hrs on 24 February. The tanker sank slowly and Toward  rescued all 42 of the crew. U-558 approached again at 0230 hrs and fired a single torpedo at Edison. The torpedo missed, and Edison was unaware it had been fired at. U-558 torpedoed the Norwegian tanker Eidanger at 0255 hrs. U-558 reloaded and at 0550 hrs torpedoed the British tankers Anadara and Finnanger, and the British freighter White Crest. All three ships straggled and were sunk. Later that morning, the convoy commodore sent a signal to the escort commander regarding the performance of U-558: "That chap must be one of their best ones. I do hope you have done him in."

U-158

 found the convoy at 0425 hrs on 24 February and torpedoed the British tanker . Empire Celt was using the Admiralty Net Defence system, streaming a strong steel net from  booms along either side of the ship. One torpedo broke through the net and hit amidships. Empire Celt later broke in half, but a tug from Newfoundland rescued 31 from the crew of 37.

As U-558 was torpedoing ships on the starboard side of the convoy, U-158 approached the port side and torpedoed British tanker Diloma at 0635 hrs. Diloma was the only one of the torpedoed ships to successfully reach Halifax. Both U-158 and U-558 dived to avoid being seen in the early daylight. U-558 found and sank the Eidanger, drifting and abandoned astern of the convoy, with gunfire and a torpedo. All of Eidangers crew had been rescued. Lea investigated a DF bearing from Toward at 1515 and spotted U-558 20 miles astern of the convoy at 1707 hrs. Lea dropped eight depth charges at 1746 hrs, and then surprised the U-boat on the surface at 1813 and dropped 14 depth charges at 1847 hrs. U-558 was undamaged.

Nicholson investigated a DF bearing from Toward and sighted U-158 at 1323. U-158 dived and evaded Nicholson. Nicholson then slowed to listen. U-158 crashed-dived before Nicholson saw the U-boat. U-158 again avoided detection by crash-diving. Edison finally spotted U-158 making another convoy approach at 2008 hrs and dropped 25 depth charges over the following six hours. U-158 was undamaged, but had been prevented from making further attacks on the convoy. Admiral Karl Dönitz, the BdU or commander in chief of U-Boats, ordered his U-boats to discontinue the attack on 25 February. The remainder of the convoy reached Halifax on 1 March 1942.

Ships in convoy

Allied merchant ships
A total of 39 cargo vessels (37 merchant, 2 US Navy) joined the convoy, either in Liverpool or later in the voyage.

Convoy escorts
A task unit of armed military ships, TU 4.1.5, escorted the convoy during its journey, joined later by a United States Coast Guard vessel.

See also
 Convoy Battles of World War II

Notes

References
 
 
 
 
 
 
 

ON067
Naval battles of World War II involving Canada
C